Cítoliby (until 1923 Citoliby) is a market town in Louny District in the Ústí nad Labem Region of the Czech Republic. It has about 1,100 inhabitants.

Notable people
Václav Jan Kopřiva (1708–1789), composer and organist
Karel Blažej Kopřiva (1756–1785), composer and organist
Josef Mocker (1835–1899), architect and restorer

References

Populated places in Louny District
Market towns in the Czech Republic